The Kanuku Mountains are a group of mountains in Guyana, located in the Upper Takutu-Upper Essequibo region. The name means 'forest' in the Wapishana language, a reference to the rich diversity of wildlife found there.  The Eastern Kanuku Mountains and the Western Kanuku Mountains are separated by the Rupununi River. In 2011, the mountains were designated National Protected Area.

History
The lowland forests sustain 53% of all the known bird species in Guyana, and about 70% of all mammals found in Guyana, live in the Kanuku Mountains. Prominent species include the Giant otter, the Harpy eagle and the Arapaima. The highest peak of the Kanuku Mountains rises to 1,067 metres while the savannah area varies between 120 and 150 metres.

In 2010, concern for the fate of the wildlife of the Kanuku Mountains was raised by the completion of the Takutu River Bridge and matching road system linking coastal Guyana with the interior and the Brazilian frontier. The road passes close to the Kanukus and is a potential source of unsustainable resource exploitation.

In 2011, the mainly uninhabited area was protected, and designated a National Protected Area. It is being maintained by the Kanuku Mountains Project. The conservation area measures . The area around the mountains is inhabited by the Macushi and Wapishana people in 21 communities who use the resources of mountains for their subsistence living.

See also
 Rupununi

References

Bibliography
 

Guayana Highlands
Mountain ranges of Guyana
National parks of Guyana
Upper Takutu-Upper Essequibo
Protected areas of Guyana